The Redesdale railway line was a branch railway line off the Melbourne–Murray River line in Australia. The line was conceived in the Railway Construction Act 1884, which was known as the Octopus Act for its profligacy. The line never paid.
The line had seven stations, including its junction with Melbourne - Murray River Railway at Redesdale Junction. The other stations were Edgecombe, Green Hill, East Metcalfe, Emberton, Barfold and Redesdale.

Little survives of the line, but one of the old railway residences was moved to nearby Metcalfe where it is still used as a residence.

References

Closed railway lines in Australia
Railway lines opened in 1891
Railway lines closed in 1954